Owen Alun Dawkins (born 23 November 1978) is an English cricketer.  Dawkins is a right-handed batsman who bowls leg break.  He was born at Cheltenham, Gloucestershire.

Dawkins made his debut in Minor counties cricket for Hertfordshire, playing 2 matches for the county in the MCCA Knockout Trophy against the Middlesex Cricket Board and Suffolk.

The following season, Dawkins made his Minor Counties Championship debut for Wales Minor Counties against Oxfordshire.  From 2001 to 2003, he represented the team in 17 Championship matches, the last of which came against Oxfordshire.  His MCCA Knockout Trophy debut for the team came in 2001 against the Worcestershire Cricket Board.  From 2001 to 2004, he represented the team in 9 Trophy matches, the last of which came against Berkshire.  His debut List A appearance for the team came in the 2nd round of the 2002 Cheltenham & Gloucester Trophy against the Sussex Cricket Board, with the match being played in 2001.  From 2001 to 2004, he represented the team in 5 List A matches, the last of which came against Middlesex in the 2nd round of the 2004 Cheltenham & Gloucester Trophy.  In his 5 List A matches, he scored 29 runs at a batting average of 9.66, with a high score of 18.  With the ball he took a single wickets at a bowling average of 81.00, with best figures of 1/21.

In 2005, he briefly rejoined Hertfordshire, before representing Buckinghamshire in 2 MCCA Knockout Trophy matches against Wiltshire and Hertfordshire.  He currently plays club cricket for Sully Centurions Cricket Club in the South Wales Cricket League.

Previously, Dawkins played for no fewer than 9 first-class counties Second XI teams between 1997 and 2010.

References

External links
Owen Dawkins at Cricinfo
Owen Dawkins at CricketArchive

1978 births
Living people
Sportspeople from Cheltenham
English cricketers
Hertfordshire cricketers
Wales National County cricketers
Buckinghamshire cricketers